ASV Hamm-Westfalen e.V. is a handball club from Hamm in North Rhine-Westphalia, Germany. They play in Handball-Bundesliga, the top division of German handball, after promotion from the 2. Handball-Bundesliga in the 2021-22 season. The club play their home matches at Westpress Arena.

Accomplishments
 2. Handball-Bundesliga:
 : 2010
 : 2021

 Handball-Regionalliga West:
 : 2005

 Oberliga Westfalen:
 : 2003

Team

Current squad
Squad for the 2022–23 season

Goalkeepers
1  Felix Hertlein
 21  Vladimir Božić
 76  Jan Wesemann
Left wingers
3  Fabian Huesmann
 14  Alexander Schulze
Right wingers
 26  Jan Pretzewosky
 96  Tim Roman Wieling
Line players
 15  Lars Kooij
 31  Benjamin Meschke
 99  Stefan Bauer

Left backs
6  Markus Fuchs
9  Mait Patrail
 29  Marian Orlowski
 77  Savvas Savvas
Centre Backs
 11  Niko Bratzke
 23  Björn Zintel
 27  Florian Schöße
 34  Yonatan Dayan
Right backs
 28  Andreas Bornemann
 95  Jan von Boenigk

References

External links
 Official website

German handball clubs
Handball-Bundesliga
Handball clubs established in 1904
1904 establishments in Germany
Hamm